The Multimedia University of Kenya (MMU) is a public university located in Nairobi, Nairobi County, Kenya. The university offers IT & related courses , Mass media, Business,Engineering and Social sciences education.

Campus
The university has two campuses: 
 The main campus is located near the western side of the Nairobi National Park on Magadi Road in Nairobi. It has a telecommunications museum and several residential halls.
The second campus is located in the Nairobi Central Business District, in Uniafric House on Loita Street.

History
MMU was founded in 1948 when the institution was founded as Central Training School to serve as East African Post Training School before changing to Kenya Posts and Telecommunications Corporation (KPTC). This was after the collapse of the East African community in 1977. In 1992, the college was upgraded to Kenya College of Communications Technology under KPTC and later (1999) became a subsidiary of Telkom Kenya Ltd (TKL), after KPTC split into Postal Corporation of Kenya, Telkom Kenya Ltd and Communications Commission of Kenya (CCK). The college became a subsidiary of CCK after the privatization of TKL  in 2006. In 2008, it was upgraded under Legal Notice No. 155 of 2008 to Multimedia University College of Kenya as a constituent college of Jomo Kenyatta University of Agriculture and Technology.

Award of charter
After an inspection conducted by the Commission for University Education, a body set aside by the Kenyan government to oversee the quality of higher education in the country, the immediate former president, Hon. Mwai Kibaki, granted a university charter to the college, thereby giving it university status on March 1, 2013. From then, the institution became known as the Multimedia University of Kenya.

Academics
MMU courses include certificate, diploma, bachelor's degree and master's degree courses. Through its centre for further Education, the university offers short courses aimed at complementing the academic programmes being offered and offer students extra training.

The MMU academic calendar operates on two semesters that run from January to April and September to December.

Faculties
The six faculties of MMU are:-
 Faculty of Engineering and Technology
 Faculty of Computing and Information Technology
 Faculty of Media and Communication
 Faculty of Business and Economics
 Faculty of Science and Technology
 Faculty of Social Sciences and Technology

Library
The collection covers all programmes offered by the university, that is, Media and Communication, Engineering, ICT and Business programmes. The library conducts training on how to access the e-resources in the e-resources centre located within the library. The MMU library contains four sections: circulation services, technical services, collection development and e-resources centre.

ICT Museum
MMU has an ICT museum. The ICT museum is located in the main campus along Magadi road, and is open to the general public as well. It is actually the largest Ict museum in East and Central Africa.

Vision 2030 Kenya
MMU is going to be involved in the development Konza Technology City. MMU Kenya has adopted a similar strategy as MMU Malaysia in which MMU Kenya is to accelerate the development of Kenya's Information and Knowledge sectors. This is one of the pillars meant to transform Kenya to a middle income economy under Vision 2030 .

Recognition
In 2012, MMU was recognized as the top ranking public university in Kenya in ICT excellence. It is also the training centre for the SAP Skills for Africa Program whose main purpose is to train African university graduates in software engineering.

See also
 Joseph Gitile Naituli

References

Educational institutions established in 1948
Multimedia University of Kenya
1948 establishments in Kenya
Universities in Kenya